The Choctaw Route Station is a historic former railroad station on East 3rd Street in the riverfront area of Little Rock, Arkansas.   The building now houses the Clinton School of Public Service, a branch of the University of Arkansas at the Clinton Presidential Center.  The station, built in 1899 for the Choctaw, Oklahoma and Gulf Railroad, is a single-story brick building with elaborate terra cotta detailing, and is one of the architecturally finest stations in the state.

Major named passenger trains included: 
Californian
Cherokee
Choctaw Rocket
Memphis-Californian
Southwest Express

By the mid-1960s the trains had dwindled down the Memphis-Californian successor, the Memphis-Tucumcari, an overnight coach-only Memphis-Little Rock-Oklahoma City-Amarillo-Tucumcari train.  This final train at the station was terminated between fall 1967 and summer 1968.

The station was listed on the National Register of Historic Places in 1975.

See also
National Register of Historic Places listings in Little Rock, Arkansas

References

Railway stations on the National Register of Historic Places in Arkansas
Railway stations in the United States opened in 1899
Little Rock
National Register of Historic Places in Little Rock, Arkansas
Transportation in Little Rock, Arkansas
1899 establishments in Arkansas
Former railway stations in Arkansas